AIML may refer to:

All-India Muslim League, a political party in South-Asia
Artificial Intelligence Markup Language, an XML dialect for creating natural language software agents
Australian Institute for Machine Learning, a research institute in Adelaide, Australia